Re-Animator is a British thrash metal band, which formed in Hull, East Riding of Yorkshire, England in 1987, broke up in 1993, and then re-formed in 2013.

Early years
Re-animator was formed in 1987 by Mike Abel and Kevin Ingleson. Ingleson was a rhythm guitarist who had been an admirer of Abel's style of playing. They started to write some songs together – the first two were "Follow the Masses" and "Push the Button", which were on their first and only demo tape. The demos were recorded at Animal Tracks Recording Studio in Hull in March 1988, over two days. Abel and Ingleson were looking for a bass player and a drummer, and they asked Mark Dennis to drum on a demo tape. Tony Calvert agreed to do vocals but declined to join the band full-time, as he was involved in another band at the time. John Wilson then joined on bass guitar.

Re-Animator began playing gigs. One of their early ones was at the Frog & Toad in Bradford with Acid Reign. Both the bands hit it off, and Acid Reign asked for a demo tape. The tape found its way to Music for Nations who contacted the band and asked them to come to London and talk about contracts. Re-animator duly signed a record contract for three albums with Music For Nations.  When the record label asked the group if they had plenty of other songs, the group stated "yes loads, we are ready to go" – but in reality they did not. In the car on the way home, they started writing the tracks that became the mini LP Deny Reality (1989).

Discography

Studio releases
Deny Reality (1988) (Mini LP)
Condemned to Eternity (1989)
Laughing (1990)
That Was Then This Is Now (1992)
One More War EP (2019)

Other releases / compilations
Speed Kills 4 (1989)
Metal Hammer’s Best of British Steel (1989)
A History of a Time to Come

TV appearances
Granada TV, UK - Other Side of Midnight; 18 April 1989, presenter Tony H Wilson
Mosh TV, Bochum, Germany, 1991 – With Exodus / Nuclear Assault

Members
 Kev Ingleson – 1988–1992; 2013–present – lead vocals/lead/rhythm guitar 
 Mike Abel – 1988–1993; 2013–2015 – lead/rhythm guitar/backing vocals
 John Wilson – 1988–1993; 2013–2018 – bass/backing vocals
 Mark Dennis – 1988–1993; 2013-2016 – drums/backing vocals
 Lee Robinson – 1992–1993 – vocals
 Graham Dixon – 1992–1993 – lead and rhythm guitar/backing vocals 
 Adam Clark – 1993 – lead and rhythm guitar/vocals
 Tony Calvert – 1988 – Vocals
 Dan Murray – 2015–present – guitar/vocals
 Jamie "Jac" Cammish – 2016–present - drums

References

Musical groups established in 1987
English thrash metal musical groups